You Should Know by Now is the title of several songs and musical albums

 You Should Know By Now a track on both the 1981 album Something About You and 1986 album Live from Manila, both by Angela Bofill
 You Should Know By Now, a track on the 1985 album Invasion of Your Privacy by Ratt
 You Should Know By Now (2001) by Barbara Manning
 You Should Know By Now (2010) by Girls Names
 You Should Know By Now by Danny Jones of McFly